Cryptosporiopsis is a genus of fungi belonging to the family Dermateaceae.

The genus has cosmopolitan distribution.

Species
Species:

Cryptosporiopsis alnea 
Cryptosporiopsis aucubicola 
Cryptosporiopsis balsameae

References

Dermateaceae
Dermateaceae genera